Hotter than Hell Tour was the second tour of the American rock band Kiss. The tour featured songs from their first album and their newly released second album, Hotter than Hell, which was the album that the tour was in support of. During this tour, the band used fire and the destruction of guitars as part of their show. The January 31, 1975, show in San Francisco was filmed and later made available for public viewing.

In the tour program for the band's final tour, Stanley reflected on the tour:

Reception
Two local reporters from MSU State News and State Journal who attended the October 21 and 22, 1974,  performances had given the sold out performances positive reviews, noting that their overall show was good, the music tight, and their musicianship  excellent. Although mixed on the costume designs, the reviewers cited the high energy from the audience attending the performances and the band's rising popularity in Detroit.

Following the London, Ontario, Canada, performance, a reporter from London Free Press had given the performance a mixed review, stating: "Kiss is a tight well rehearsed band with some excellent musical ideas. Unfortunately, the ability to hear any of this is lost in the incredible amount of distortion which is created by Kiss' pain-inducing volume level. Kiss has something to offer musically but the glitter and whiteface is on its way out and if the group is to remain alive, it must change and face the future that one of its members is supposed to represent."

Setlist
"Deuce"
"Strutter"
"Got to Choose"
"Hotter than Hell"
"Firehouse"
"She" (with guitar solo)
"Watchin' You"
"Nothin' to Lose"
"Strange Ways"
"Parasite"
"100,000 Years" (with bass solo and drum solo)
"Black Diamond"
Encore
"Cold Gin"
"Let Me Go, Rock 'n' Roll"

Tour dates

Personnel
Paul Stanley – vocals, rhythm guitar
Gene Simmons – vocals, bass
Peter Criss – drums, vocals
Ace Frehley – lead guitar, backing vocals

References

Bibliography

Kiss (band) concert tours
1974 concert tours
1975 concert tours

es:Kiss Alive/35 World Tour
fr:Alive 35
it:Kiss Alive/35 World Tour
pt:Kiss Alive/35 World Tour
sv:Kiss Alive/35 World Tour